The C-44 Reservoir and Stormwater Treatment Area is the first component of the Indian River Lagoon-South (IRL-S) project, part of the Comprehensive Everglades Restoration Plan (CERP), a joint effort between the U.S. Army Corps of Engineers Jacksonville District and the local sponsor, the South Florida Water Management District.

Location

History

Environment

Timeline

C-44 Reservoir and STA - SFMWD Engineering Project Visualization

Indian River Lagoon
Canals in Florida
Reservoirs in Florida